Myia or Muia may refer to:

People 
 Myia, a philosopher, daughter of Theano and Pythagoras
 Myia, a poetess from Sparta
 Myia, the nickname of the ancient Greek poetess Corinna

Insect 
 Μυῖα, ancient Greek for fly

Mythology 
 Myia, a girl who was transformed into a fly by Selene.